Fihaonana, Tsiroanomandidy is a town and commune in Madagascar. It belongs to the district of Tsiroanomandidy, which is a part of Bongolava Region. The population of the commune was estimated to be approximately 27,000 in 2001 commune census.

Only primary schooling is available. The majority 59% of the population of the commune are farmers, while an additional 40% receives their livelihood from raising livestock. The most important crops are rice and maize; also cassava is an important agricultural product. Services provide employment for 1% of the population.

References and notes 

Populated places in Bongolava